Talis grisescens is a moth in the family Crambidae described by Ivan Nikolayevich Filipjev and A. Diakonoff in 1924. It is found in Central Asia, where it has been recorded from the Syr Darya region.

References

Ancylolomiini
Moths described in 1924
Moths of Asia